Stanton County (standard abbreviation: ST) is a county located in the U.S. state of Kansas. As of the 2020 census, the county population was 2,084. Its county seat is Johnson City.

Geography

Major highways
 U.S. Highway 160
 Kansas Highway 27

Adjacent counties
 Hamilton County (north/Mountain Time border)
 Grant County (east)
 Stevens County (southeast)
 Morton County (south)
 Baca County, Colorado (west/Mountain Time border)
 Prowers County, Colorado (northwest/Mountain Time border)

Demographics

As of the census of 2000, there were 2,406 people, 858 households, and 638 families residing in the county.  The population density was 4 people per square mile (1/km2).  There were 1,007 housing units at an average density of 2 per square mile (1/km2).  The racial makeup of the county was 84.41% White, 0.62% Black or African American, 1.21% Native American, 0.17% Asian, 12.51% from other races, and 1.08% from two or more races.  23.69% of the population were Hispanic or Latino of any race.

There were 858 households, out of which 40.20% had children under the age of 18 living with them, 63.50% were married couples living together, 6.80% had a female householder with no husband present, and 25.60% were non-families. 22.60% of all households were made up of individuals, and 9.00% had someone living alone who was 65 years of age or older.  The average household size was 2.74 and the average family size was 3.21.

In the county, the population was spread out, with 30.80% under the age of 18, 8.40% from 18 to 24, 28.30% from 25 to 44, 19.50% from 45 to 64, and 13.00% who were 65 years of age or older.  The median age was 34 years. For every 100 females there were 104.10 males.  For every 100 females age 18 and over, there were 103.20 males.

The median income for a household in the county was $40,172, and the median income for a family was $46,300. Males had a median income of $30,236 versus $21,250 for females. The per capita income for the county was $18,043.  About 10.70% of families and 14.90% of the population were below the poverty line, including 16.80% of those under age 18 and 12.90% of those age 65 or over.

Government
Stanton County is almost always Republican, The last time a democratic candidate carried the county was in 1964 by Lyndon B. Johnson.

Presidential elections

Laws
Although the Kansas Constitution was amended in 1986 to allow the sale of alcoholic liquor by the individual drink with the approval of voters, Stanton County has remained a prohibition, or "dry", county, one of only three such counties left in the state.

Education

Unified school districts
 Stanton County USD 452

Communities

Cities
 Johnson City
 Manter

Unincorporated communities
† means a Census-Designated Place (CDP) by the United States Census Bureau.
 Big Bow†
 Julian
 Saunders

Townships
Stanton County is divided into three townships.  None of the cities within the county are considered governmentally independent, and all figures for the townships include those of the cities.  In the following table, the population center is the largest city (or cities) included in that township's population total, if it is of a significant size.

See also

References

Further reading

External links

County
 
 Stanton County - Directory of Public Officials
Maps
 Stanton County Maps: Current, Historic, KDOT
 Kansas Highway Maps: Current, Historic, KDOT
 Kansas Railroad Maps: Current, 1996, 1915, KDOT and Kansas Historical Society

 
Kansas counties
1887 establishments in Kansas
Populated places established in 1887